Another Case of Milton Jones is the third distinct comedy programme starring Milton Jones to be broadcast by BBC Radio 4 (the others being The Very World of Milton Jones and The House of Milton Jones).  The programme ran for five series, the last of which began on Thursday 21 July 2011. The four previous series were broadcast in 2005, 2007, 2008, 2010.

Premise

Each week Milton plays the part of an expert in a given field, with no ability at all in the subject.  Assisting him are his good friend Anton, (Tom Goodman-Hill) whom Milton knew from an early age (though the exact scenarios differ from episode to episode), and, for the first series, Milton's sister Susan (Debbie Chazen).  These two characters were first introduced in The House of Milton Jones but show no continuity from that programme.  Typically two further actors would provide voices for the other major characters in the show with all the actors playing various minor characters, normally putting on different accents.

Episode list

References

External links

BBC Radio comedy programmes
1998 radio programme debuts